The hundreds of persons bearing the surname Lambert include a number of musicians:

Michel Lambert (1610– 29 June 1696), French singing master, theorbist and composer.
Charles-Richard Lambert (died 1862), African-American musician, conductor and music educator
Charles Lucien Lambert (1828–96), African-American composer
George Lambert (baritone) (1900–1971), English baritone mainly active in Canada
Donald Lambert (1904–1962), American jazz stride pianist
Constant Lambert (1905 – 1951), British composer, conductor, critic and memoirist.
Dave Lambert (American jazz vocalist) (1917–1966), American jazz lyricist and singer
Pee Wee Lambert (1924–1965), American mandolinist
John Lambert (composer) (1926–1995), British composer and teacher
Kit Lambert (1935–1981), English record producer (son of Constant Lambert)
Franz Lambert (b. 1948), German composer and organist
Dave Lambert (English musician) (born 1949), songwriter, guitarist and singer
Lisa Lambert (b. 1962), Canadian actress, writer and songwriter
Adrian Lambert (b. 1972), English bassist and songwriter
Alison Lambert (b. 1977), British clarinetist
Miranda Lambert (b. 1983), American country music singer
Michelle Lambert (b. 1985), American pop singer
Mary Lambert (singer) (b. 1989), American singer-songwriter
Lambert (masked pianist) (fl. 2014), pseudonymous pianist/composer from Hamburg